Felix Winther (born 18 May 2000) is a Danish football midfielder who plays for Tromsø IL.

References

2000 births
Living people
Danish men's footballers
Fremad Amager players
Tromsø IL players
Danish expatriate men's footballers
Expatriate footballers in Norway
Danish expatriate sportspeople in Norway
Danish 1st Division players
Eliteserien players
Association football midfielders